Virginia Marion Halas McCaskey (born January 5, 1923) is an American football executive who is the principal owner of the Chicago Bears of the National Football League (NFL). She is the eldest child of Bears founder and owner George Halas, who left the team to his daughter upon his death in 1983, and Minnie Bushing Halas. After the death of Buffalo Bills owner Ralph Wilson in March 2014, she became the oldest owner in the NFL and in all major league sports in the United States.

Officially, she is the secretary of the Bears franchise, as well as a member of the team's board of directors. However, she is empowered to vote the shares of her children and grandchildren as well as her own. Between them, McCaskey and other Halas heirs own 80% of the Bears. The franchise has been in the hands of the Halas-McCaskey family since George Halas acquired the then-Decatur Staleys from A. E. Staley and moved the team to Chicago in 1921, renaming the team the Bears the following year. The Bears have been owned by the same family for longer than any other family has owned an NFL team.

McCaskey turned 100 on January 5, 2023.

Career
George Halas had initially intended for Virginia's younger brother, George "Mugs" Halas Jr., to inherit the team, and passed the team presidency to him in 1963. However, Mugs died suddenly of a heart attack in 1979. Thus, it was Virginia who inherited the Bears when her father died four years later. McCaskey inherited a Bears team that won Super Bowl XX two seasons after "Papa Bear's" death. It was part of a run of five consecutive NFC Central titles from 1984 to 1988.

However, the team struggled in the 1990s, and since 1999 she has been a very hands-off owner. Her son Michael McCaskey was team president from 1983 to 1999 and was chairman of the board until May 6, 2011, when his brother George assumed the position. George McCaskey had been the Bears ticket office director since 1991.  Team president Ted Phillips currently has operational control; when he assumed the post in 1999, it marked the first time in the NFL portion of franchise history that a Halas or McCaskey had not held that title.

Halas's husband, Ed McCaskey, was previously the chairman and treasurer of the Bears. Although McCaskey never had any official share of ownership, he acted as co-owner alongside his wife before his death in 2003.

On January 21, 2007, she accepted the NFC Championship trophy, which bears her father's name. She called it "her happiest day so far", after the Bears had beaten the New Orleans Saints to earn a trip to Super Bowl XLI.

McCaskey is one of ten female NFL owners as of 2022, including Sheila Ford Hamp (Detroit Lions), Amy Adams Strunk (Tennessee Titans), Kim Pegula (Buffalo Bills), Carol Davis (Las Vegas Raiders), Denise DeBartolo York (San Francisco 49ers), Gayle Benson (New Orleans Saints), Janice McNair (Houston Texans), Jody Allen (Seattle Seahawks), and Dee Haslam (Cleveland Browns).

After the death of Arizona Cardinals owner Bill Bidwill in October 2019, McCaskey became the longest-tenured owner in the NFL.

Personal life
Virginia attended Drexel University, majoring in secretarial studies with the aspiration of serving as her father's secretary. She was an active member of the local Pi Sigma Gamma sorority, the Newman Club, the Panhellenic Council, and the YWCA. She is known for being "proudly private" pertaining to the team her father built, rarely discussing the business aspect of her life. She and her late husband Ed have 11 children and more than 40 grandchildren and great-grandchildren. McCaskey is a Roman Catholic and considers "faith, family, and football" indivisible in her life.

References

1923 births
Living people
American centenarians
American people of Czech descent
Chicago Bears owners
Women in American professional sports management
Sportspeople from Chicago
Halas family
Women centenarians
Women National Football League executives
Women sports owners
American Roman Catholics